Cléber Janderson Pereira Reis (born 5 December 1990), known as Cléber Reis or simply Cléber, is a Brazilian professional footballer who plays as a central defender.

Club career

Early career
Born in São Francisco do Conde, Bahia, Cléber started his career with Brasília-based club Legião before joining Paulista in 2009. He made his senior debut for the latter on 5 September 2009, starting in a 2–1 away win against Ponte Preta for the year's Copa Paulista. His first senior goal came on 14 November, in a 1–1 draw at Botafogo-SP.

Rarely used, Cléber subsequently served loans at Itumbiara and Catanduvense before being transferred in 2012.

Ponte Preta
On 25 April 2012, Cléber joined Série A club Ponte Preta. He made his top tier debut on 2 September, coming on as a late substitute for Marcinho in a 3–1 home win against Atlético Goianiense, also scoring the last goal.

Cléber was an undisputed starter for Ponte during the 2013 Campeonato Paulista, appearing in 21 matches and scoring three goals as his side was knocked out in the semifinals; he was also chosen in the tournament's Team of the year.

Corinthians
On 22 July 2013, Cléber Reis signed a four-year contract with fellow first division side Corinthians, with the club retaining 20% of the player's federative rights and a third part ownership retaining the remaining 80%. He made his debut for the club on 2 October, starting and scoring the second in a 2–0 home win against Bahia.

A backup to Paulo André and Gil, Cléber became a starter after the former's departure to Shanghai Shenhua in January 2014.

Hamburger SV
Cléber Reis joined Bundesliga side Hamburger SV in late August 2014, signing a four-year contract until 2018. Hamburg had to pay a transfer fee of believed to be around €3 million.

Cléber Reis scored his first goal for HSV in a 2–1 win over Mainz 05 on 7 December 2014.

Santos
On 13 December 2016, Cléber Reis joined Santos back in his home country, after an € 2 million offer was accepted by HSV. He arrived in Brazil two days later, and signed a four-year contract with the club shortly after.

Cléber Reis made his debut for the club on 18 February 2017, starting and being sent off in a 1–0 Campeonato Paulista home loss against Ferroviária. He made his Copa Libertadores debut on 9 March, starting in a 1–1 away draw against Sporting Cristal.

On 18 August 2017, after appearing rarely, Cléber Reis was loaned to fellow top tier club Coritiba until the end of the season. A regular starter, he scored two goals for the side but eventually suffered relegation.

On 3 April 2018, Cléber Reis was loaned to Paraná still in the main category, until December. He again suffered team relegation, but was separated from the squad in the latter part of the tournament.

On 24 June 2019, after spending the first six months without playing, Cléber Reis was loaned to Oeste in the Série B, until December. The following 2 January, he returned to his previous club Ponte Preta on loan for the 2020 campaign, but returned to his parent club on 10 December after featuring rarely.

After spending the 2021 season separated from the first team squad, Cléber Reis suffered a knee injury in training. On 8 February 2022, he left the club after reaching an agreement to terminate his contract.

Career statistics

Honours

Individual
Campeonato Paulista Team of the year: 2013

References

External links
 

1990 births
Living people
Sportspeople from Bahia
Brazilian footballers
Association football defenders
Campeonato Brasileiro Série A players
Campeonato Brasileiro Série B players
Campeonato Brasileiro Série D players
Paulista Futebol Clube players
Itumbiara Esporte Clube players
Associação Atlética Ponte Preta players
Sport Club Corinthians Paulista players
Santos FC players
Coritiba Foot Ball Club players
Paraná Clube players
Oeste Futebol Clube players
Bundesliga players
Hamburger SV players
Brazilian expatriate footballers
Brazilian expatriate sportspeople in Germany
Expatriate footballers in Germany